
Year 691 (DCXCI) was a common year starting on Sunday (link will display the full calendar) of the Julian calendar. The denomination 691 for this year has been used since the early medieval period, when the Anno Domini calendar era became the prevalent method in Europe for naming years.

Events 
 By place 
 Europe 
 King Theuderic III dies and is succeeded by his son Clovis IV, age 9, as sole ruler of the Franks. He becomes a puppet—a roi fainéant—of his uncle Pepin of Herstal, mayor of the palace of Austrasia.

 Arabian Empire 
 Battle of Maskin: An Umayyad army under caliph Abd al-Malik defeats the rebel forces in Mesopotamia (modern Iraq). He reconquers the Arabian Peninsula, taking the holy city of Medina.

 By topic 
 Architecture 
 The Dome of the Rock is completed in Jerusalem (under the patronage of Abd al-Malik) during the Second Fitna, becoming the first work of Islamic architecture.

 Religion 
 Wilfrid, abbot of Ripon, tries to make himself bishop of all Northumbria. King Aldfrith seizes many of his Ripon Abbey estates, and proposes to create a bishopric there. Wilfrid is banished and flees to Mercia, where King Æthelred makes him bishop of  Leicester.

Births 
 Hisham ibn Abd al-Malik, Muslim caliph (d. 743)
 Marwan II, Muslim caliph (d. 750)

Deaths 
 August 24 – Fu Youyi, official of the Tang Dynasty
 November 7 – Cen Changqian, official of the Tang Dynasty
 November 7 – Ge Fuyuan, official of the Tang Dynasty
 Fithceallach mac Flainn, king of Uí Maine (Ireland)
 Theuderic III, king of the Franks (b. 654)
 Sun Guoting, Chinese calligrapher (b. 646)

References

Sources